Elio Rodríguez (born November 13, 1962 in Rocha, Uruguay) is a former Uruguayan footballer who played for clubs of Uruguay, Argentina and Chile.

Teams
  Liverpool 1986-1987
  Deportivo Mandiyú 1987-1992
  Chaco For Ever 1992-1993
  Cobreloa 1993
  Huracán Buceo 1994
  Villa Española 1994-1997
  Frontera Rivera 1998-1999

External links
 Profile at BDFA 
 Profile at Futbol XXI
 

1962 births
Living people
People from Rocha Department
Uruguayan footballers
Uruguayan expatriate footballers
Uruguay international footballers
Liverpool F.C. (Montevideo) players
Deportivo Mandiyú footballers
Chaco For Ever footballers
Cobreloa footballers
Expatriate footballers in Chile
Expatriate footballers in Argentina

Association football midfielders